WYUR (103.7 FM) is a radio station licensed to Gilman, Illinois, and serving Iroquois. Kankakee, and Ford Counties. WYUR has a country music format and is owned by Milner Media Partners, LLC.

History

WFAV
The station began broadcasting in 2007, holding the call sign WFAV. The station was originally owned by Milner Broadcasting, and its transmitter was located south of Crescent City, Illinois. The station originally had an oldies format, simulcasting the programming of 95.1 WVLI "The Valley" until 2011. The station then adopted a CHR format, as "Your New FAVorite Hit Radio Station". In 2011, the station's transmitter was moved to northwest of Ashkum, Illinois.

WYUR
On February 20, 2013, the station's call sign was changed to WYUR, and its format from CHR to classic rock, branded as "Classic Rock 103.7". Later in 2013, WYUR's format was changed to country, and the station was branded "River Country", simulcasting 101.7 WIVR. In 2018, Milner Broadcasting was sold to the newly formed Milner Media Partners.

References

External links

YUR
Country radio stations in the United States
Radio stations established in 2007
2007 establishments in Illinois